Arthur Royle (23 April 1895 – 8 August 1973) was a priest of the Church of England. He was the Archdeacon of Huntingdon from 1954 to 1965.

Royle was educated at Maidstone Grammar School and Keble College, Oxford.  He was ordained in 1924 and was a curate at St John Evangelist's East Dulwich and then Vicar of St Paul's Newington. He was Rector of Orton Longueville from 1942 to 1966.

References

1895 births
People educated at Maidstone Grammar School
Alumni of Keble College, Oxford
Archdeacons of Huntingdon
1973 deaths